Las Vegas is a town, with a population of 10,760 (2020 calculation), and a municipality in the Honduran department of Santa Bárbara.

Demographics
At the time of the 2013 Honduras census, Las Vegas municipality had a population of 23,980. Of these, 95.98% were Mestizo, 3.19% White, 0.55% Indigenous, 0.25% Black or Afro-Honduran and 0.03% others.

References 

Municipalities of the Santa Bárbara Department, Honduras